Wallah is a common suffix in many languages of South Asia.

Wallah may also refer to:
 Wallah, an Arabic expression meaning "I swear by God" used to make a promise or express great credibility

See also 
 Wala  (disambiguation)
 Walla (disambiguation)
 Walla Walla  (disambiguation)